Melissa Shusterman (born September 8, 1967) is a Democratic member of the Pennsylvania House of Representatives for the 157th District, which covers parts of Chester County and Montgomery County. She was elected in 2018.

Early life and education

Shusterman was born in Augusta, Georgia and raised in Tredyffrin Township. She attended Conestoga High School. In 1989, she graduated from Lafayette College with a bachelor's degree in Russian Studies and History. She later obtained a master's degree in Film and Television from American University in Washington, DC. Shusterman returned to the Chester County area and launched Fedora Media, a video production company, while raising her son as a single mother.

Career
Shusterman was first elected in 2018, successfully unseating four-term incumbent Republican Representative Warren Kampf with 57 percent of the vote. During her campaign, she was endorsed by organizations such as Planned Parenthood, the Pennsylvania Fraternal Order of Police, and the Sierra Club, as well as by former President Barack Obama. Her committee assignments include the Aging and Older Adult Services, Children & Youth, Commerce, and Rules. Shusterman also serves as Democratic secretary of the Judiciary committee. Shusterman is the first freshman representative to serve as a deputy whip for her party.

Personal life
Shusterman resides in Schuylkill Township, Pennsylvania with her husband Hans and son Paris.

Electoral history

References

Democratic Party members of the Pennsylvania House of Representatives
Living people
1967 births
Politicians from Chester County, Pennsylvania
Women state legislators in Pennsylvania
21st-century American women politicians